Thomas Graham (12 March 1905 – 29 March 1983) was an English international footballer, who played as a centre half.

Career
Born in Hamsterley, Consett, Graham played professionally for Nottingham Forest, and earned two caps for England in 1931.

References

1905 births
1983 deaths
Sportspeople from Consett
Footballers from County Durham
English footballers
England international footballers
Nottingham Forest F.C. players
English Football League players
English Football League representative players
Association football central defenders